Lidia Lykova (1913-2016) was a Soviet-Russian Politician (Communist).

She was Minister of Social Affairs in 1961-1967, and Vice-chairman of the Council of ministres of the RSFSR in 1967-1985.

References

1913 births
20th-century Russian women politicians
20th-century Russian politicians
Russian communists
Soviet women in politics